EC or ec may refer to:

Arts and entertainment
 EC Comics, an American publisher of comic books
 Electric Circus, a Canadian television program
 Eric Clapton Stratocaster, signature model guitars by Fender

Businesses and organisations

Governmental
 Environment and Climate Change Canada, a Canadian federal government department
 European Commission, the executive body of the European Union
 European Council, the European Union institution comprising the college of heads of state of government
 European Communities, one of the three pillars of the EU 
 European Community, a significant component of the European Union from 1993 to 2009
 European Economic Community, informally, the European Community, an economic union from 1958 to 1993

Transportation
 EuroCity, a train service of the European inter-city rail network
 Avialeasing (IATA code), a cargo airline
 East Coast (train operating company), a train operating company in the UK
 EC, the aircraft registration prefix for Spain

Other businesses and organizations
 EC Comics, a defunct comic book company
 Eckerd College, US
 Edinburgh College, Scotland
 Equine Canada, Canada's national horse sport federation
 Engineers Canada, a national organization that regulates the practice of engineering in Canada
 Engineering Council, formerly Engineering Council UK, a regulatory authority in the UK for registration of engineers and technicians

Places
 EC postcode area, for east central London
 Ecuador (ISO 3166-1 country code)
 East Chicago, Indiana, a city in the United States

Science, technology and mathematics

Biology and medicine
 EC50, half maximal effective concentration of a drug, antibody or toxicant
 Emergency contraception
 Endothelial cell
 Enterochromaffin cell
 Entorhinal cortex, memory center in the brain
 Enzyme Commission number, EC number, used for the numerical classification of enzymes
 Extracellular

Chemistry
 Electrical conductivity of a solution
 EC meter (electrical conductivity meter), measures the electrical conductivity in a solution
 Ethylene carbonate, an ester and a popular solvent in lithium-ion batteries
 European Community number (EC-No, or EC#), determined by the European Commission for identifying chemicals

Computing
 .ec, the country code top level domain (ccTLD) for Ecuador
 eC (programming language), a programming language adding object-oriented features, dynamic modules and reflection to C
 Amazon Elastic Compute Cloud
 Electronic cash, an electronic payment system popular especially in Germany
 Evolutionary computation, computing that utilises evolution to automatically find solutions to formally defined problems
 Embedded controller, a microcontroller in computers that handles various system tasks that the operating system does not handle
 ExpressCard, an interface connecting peripheral devices to a computer, usually a laptop

Other sciences
 Edinburgh-Cape Blue Object Survey, an astronomical catalogue
 Electron capture, in nuclear physics
 Elliptic curve, in mathematics
 Emergent cyclical theory (E-C theory), in psychology
 Erasure code, in information theory
 Exacoulomb (EC), an SI unit for electric charge equal to 1018 coulomb
 Electric car, or electric vehicle (EV)

Other uses
 Eastern Caribbean dollar, sometimes abbreviated EC$
 Elimination communication, a method of toilet training
 Evolutionary creation, the idea that God used evolution to create present-day biodiversity 
 Extended coverage, in insurance
 Extra credit, in academia
 Executive Condominium, a type of housing in Singapore
 Ethiopian calendar, EC or E.C.

See also

 Embedded C++ (EC++), a programming language
 Elliptic curve cryptography (ECC)
 
 ECC (disambiguation)
 Eck (disambiguation)
 Ekk (disambiguation)
 EK (disambiguation)
 EQ (disambiguation)